Bruno Ludovic Jean Roger Martini (25 January 1962 – 20 October 2020) was a French professional footballer who played as a goalkeeper.

His professional career was closely associated with Auxerre, for which he played 13 years. Having won more than 30 caps for France during nine years, Martini represented the nation in two UEFA European Championships.

Club career
Born in Challuy, Nevers, Martini started playing professionally for AJ Auxerre. After a loan stint with AS Nancy he took the place of Paris Saint-Germain FC-bound Joël Bats, going on to appear in 322 Ligue 1 matches while also helping his team to a 1992–93 semi-final run in the UEFA Cup.

Martini left the club in the season prior to the 1995–96 conquest of the double, pushed to the sidelines by Lionel Charbonnier. He finished his career in 1999 at 37 after four seasons with Montpellier HSC, and returned to the latter side in 2015 as a goalkeeper coach.

International career
Martini played 31 times for France and played at Euro 1992 (as a starter) and Euro 1996. Immediately after his retirement, he started serving as goalkeeping coach for Les Bleus.

Death
Martini died on 20 October 2020 of heart failure in Montpellier, aged 58.

References

External links

 
 
 
 

1962 births
2020 deaths
Sportspeople from Nièvre
French footballers
France international footballers
Association football goalkeepers
AJ Auxerre players
AS Nancy Lorraine players
Montpellier HSC players
Ligue 1 players
UEFA Euro 1992 players
UEFA Euro 1996 players
Association football goalkeeping coaches
Footballers from Bourgogne-Franche-Comté